Tonja Annette Walker is an American actress and singer, who is also a former beauty pageant titleholder who has competed in the Miss USA pageant. She is known for her role as Alex Olanov on One Life to Live and for her role as Olivia St. John on General Hospital.

Career
Walker held the Miss Teen All American title in 1979 and won the Miss Maryland USA title in 1980.  That year she represented Maryland in the Miss USA 1980 pageant broadcast live from Biloxi, Mississippi, and placed in the top twelve.  She placed sixth after the preliminary round of competition, and went on to place eighth in the final swimsuit competition, seventh in interview and sixth in evening gown, and finished seventh overall. 

Her first acting role was in Liar's Moon with Matt Dillon.

Walker's work has been primarily as a performer on daytime dramas. Her first daytime role was on the television serial Capitol. She played Lizbeth Bachman, a sophisticated heiress torn between playboy Jordy Clegg and handicapped doctor Thomas McCandless. Walker played the role from the show's launch until she left in 1984.

She returned to daytime as mob princess Olivia St. John on General Hospital from 1988 to 1990, playing a villainess complicating the lives of Duke Lavery and his family. Walker would make a brief return to this role in 2017.

Walker was then cast as Alex Olanov Hesser Buchanan Buchanan on One Life to Live. Alex was initially an FBI agent, but became involved with the mob. Walker had the longest run in this role, playing Alex from 1990 to 1997, with several return visits in 2001 and 2002. She made additional appearances as Alex on One Life to Live in August 2007 for the show's 9,999th and 10,000th episodes, Her character later returned again on November 2, 2007 for a brief run  and again on January 2, 2009, March 15, 2011 and November 17, 2011.

She also had recurring roles as Marie Green on Guiding Light from 2003 to 2004, where she worked with Capitol costar Marj Dusay, and as D.A. Grace Nancier on Passions, a role meant to spoof Nancy Grace.

Walker is also a singer and has released one album collection of her songs. She produced a film in which she also appeared, The Derby Stallion. The film starred Zac Efron, Bill Cobbs, and William R. Moses and was released on video on demand and on DVD in 2007.

Personal life
Walker has two daughters and three stepchildren. Her two daughters are Isabella and Abrianna. Her three stepchildren are named Evan, Samantha, and Alec. All of her children use the last name Davidson.

Filmography
 (1981): Mr. Merlin as Jessie Taylor
 (1982–84): Capitol as Lizbeth Bachman
 (1982): Liar's Moon as Karen Covucci
 (1983): Making of a Male Model as Alma Rockwell
 (1985): Hunter as Claire Jorgensen
 (1986): T.J. Hooker as Nancy Bosca
 (1987): Kidnapped as Claudia
 (1987): Spies as Lana
 (1988–90, 2017): General Hospital as Olivia St. John
 (1990–97, 2001–02, 2007, 2009, 2011): One Life to Live as Alex Olanov
 (1994): Clear Cut (short)
 (2003–04): Guiding Light as Marie Green
 (2005): Never Been Thawed as Christian Band Slut (as Tonya Walker)
 (2005–07): Passions as Grace Nancier
 (2007): The Derby Stallion as Linda McCardle
 (2011): Spy as Yvonne Hayworth

References

External links

Miss Maryland USA official website

Tonja Walker Speaks About GH Return

American soap opera actresses
Musicians from Huntington, West Virginia
Place of birth missing (living people)
Living people
Miss USA 1980 delegates
21st-century American women
Year of birth missing (living people)